Cork or CORK may refer to:

Materials
 Cork (material), an impermeable buoyant plant product
 Cork (plug), a cylindrical or conical object used to seal a container
Wine cork

Places

Ireland
 Cork (city)
 Metropolitan Cork, also known as Greater Cork
 Cork Airport
 County Cork

Historical parliamentary constituencies
 Cork City (Parliament of Ireland constituency) 
 Cork County (Parliament of Ireland constituency)
 Cork City (UK Parliament constituency)
 Cork County (UK Parliament constituency)

United States
 Cork, Georgia
 Cork, Kentucky

Organisations
 Cork GAA, responsible for Gaelic games in County Cork
 Ye Antient Order of Noble Corks, a masonic order, also known as "The Cork"
 Cork City F.C., a football club
 Cork City W.F.C., a women's football club

Other uses
 A particular kind of trick in snowboarding and skiing. See List of snowboard tricks.
 Cork (surname)
 Cork City (barony)
 Cork encoding, a digital data format
 Cork taint, a wine fault
 Canadian Olympic-training Regatta, Kingston, a sailing regatta
 Cork (band), a 1990s rock duo/supergroup
 Cork (film), a Spanish drama

See also
 Cork County Council
 Cork Harbour
 Roman Catholic Diocese of Cork and Ross
 Cork tree (disambiguation)
 Cork oak, Quercus suber tree, the main source of cork
 Cork cambium, a tissue found in many vascular plants as part of the epidermis
 Corke, a surname
 Corky (disambiguation)
 Kork (disambiguation)
 KORK (disambiguation)